The 1982 NSWRFL season was the 75th season of professional rugby league football in Australia and saw the New South Wales Rugby Football League’s first expansion since 1967 with the introduction of the first two clubs from outside the Sydney area in over half a century: the Canberra Raiders and the Illawarra Steelers. Thus a total of 14 clubs (including 6 Sydney-based foundation teams, another 6 from Sydney, one from greater New South Wales, and one from the Australian Capital Territory) competed for the J.J. Giltinan Shield and newly-created Winfield Cup during the season, which culminated in a grand final between the Parramatta and Manly-Warringah clubs. This season, NSWRFL teams also competed for the 1982 KB Cup which was won by Manly-Warringah.

Season summary
The first Charity Shield match was played before the 1982 season between St. George and South Sydney.

This year a bronze replica of “the Gladiators” – the 1963 photo taken by John O'Gready of Norm Provan and Arthur Summons’ post-game, mud-caked embrace – was first adopted to adorn the Winfield Cup, the new trophy to be awarded to the grand final winners. Because of the introduction of two new teams, twenty-six (rather than twenty-two) regular season rounds were played from February till August, resulting in a top five of Parramatta, Manly, Norths, Easts and Wests. The new teams, the Illawarra Steelers and the Canberra Raiders, would finish their debut seasons in second last and last place respectively.

The 1982 season saw the only nil-all scoreline in competition history. Newtown and Canterbury-Bankstown drew their match at Henson Park on 28 March, with neither team scoring a point. The long-standing record for the longest suspension for a player in the League's history was broken during the season. Western Suburbs' Bob Cooper was suspended for 15 months for punching Illawarra’s Lee Pomfret.

The 1982 season's Rothmans Medallist was Canterbury-Bankstown’s Greg Brentnall and the Dally M Award went to Parramatta’s lock forward, Ray Price. Rugby League Week gave their player of the year award to Eastern Suburbs’ halfback Kevin Hastings for the third consecutive season.

Teams
This year the number of clubs in the League reached a new high of fourteen, with the addition of two  expansion clubs, the Illawarra Steelers and the Canberra Raiders. This saw the first inclusion of teams based outside of the Sydney area since the foundation Newcastle club departed the League in 1909. This was the first of several expansions that would take place over the next decade and a half which would see the Sydney-wide competition grow into a New South Wales-wide competition and eventually into a national league. Also, for the first time in three quarters of a century, the League's 1908 foundation teams were outnumbered by teams introduced since the inaugural season.

Ladder

Finals

Chart

Grand final

The Eels won the minor premiership with ease – eight points ahead of Manly – and breezed through the decider with the same confidence. Manly opened the scoring through Phil Blake in the opening minutes, but Parramatta replied quickly when Brett Kenny put Steve Ella over. After a quiet period, Manly collapsed in the ten minutes before half-time with Parramatta scoring three tries. The first to Eric Grothe came when Brett Kenny had shown brilliant evasive skills on the second tackle after Manly dropped the ball, the second came when a Peter Sterling bomb deflected off a Parramatta player into Kenny's arms, and the third after quick hands saw Kenny send Neil Hunt over in the corner. The Eels led 16–3 at half-time and, despite Les Boyd scoring after playing the ball forward in the 48th minute, Brett Kenny's second try in the 62nd minute sealed victory.

Parramatta 21 (Tries: Kenny 2, Ella, Grothe, Hunt. Goals: Cronin 3/5.)

Manly 8 (Tries: P Blake, Boyd. Goal: Eadie 1/2.)

Player statistics
The following statistics are as of the conclusion of Round 26.

Top 5 point scorers

Top 5 try scorers

Top 5 goal scorers

References

External links
Rugby League Tables – Season 1982 The World of Rugby League
Results:1981-90 at rabbitohs.com.au
1982 J J Giltinan Shield and Winfield Cup at rleague.com.au
NSRFL season 1982 at rugbyleagueproject.org

New South Wales Rugby League premiership
NSWRFL season